The Billboard magazine publishes a weekly chart that ranks the best-selling albums in the United States. The chart nowadays known as the Billboard 200 was titled Best-Selling Popular Record Albums in 1947 and was based on a "weekly survey among 4,970 dealers In all sections of the country." During the year, seven albums by five artists topped the chart. 

Bing Crosby's Merry Christmas was the first album to top the chart in the year. It started its run in November of the previous year and continued to top the chart for the first week in 1947. Like in the previous year, the album returned to number one in November for seven more weeks. The album spent 20 weeks atop the chart between December 1945 and December 1947. It was certified gold 25 years after its release by the Recording Industry Association of America (RIAA) for shipments of 500,000 or more units. The best-selling album of the previous year, Glenn Miller, topped the chart for three more weeks in early 1947, meaning the album topped the charts for 14 weeks over three years. The album finished as the third best-selling of the year and was certified gold by the RIAA in 1968. The follow-up, Glenn Miller Masterpieces, Volume II later topped the chart for one week.

Al Jolson was the only artist to place two albums atop the chart; Al Jolson, Vol. 1 and Al Jolson Souvenir Album. The first of them ascended to number one for a single week in the issue dated February 1 and reached the top again on February 15. It was the number-one album in the US for 25 weeks until August 2, making it the longest-charting album on the chart at the time. Furthermore, it was the best-selling album of the year and is estimated to have sold more than one million copies in the US. Jolson's second album debuted atop the chart in mid-August and spent nine weeks at number one, bringing his total weeks spent at number one to 34. In between Jolson's spells at number one Dorothy Shay spent five weeks in the top spot with her debut album Dorothy Shay Sings. Her album finished as the second best-selling of 1947.

Chart history

See also
1947 in music
List of Billboard 200 number-one albums

Footnotes

References

1947
United States Albums
1947 in American music